Wolseley Road is a road in the Sydney suburb of Point Piper. It is one kilometre long. It starts at New South Head Road and curves around the west side of Point Piper, terminating in a dead end above Lady Martins Beach.

Description
As at 2002, Wolseley Road was the most expensive residential road/street in Australia with 16 of the top 100 most expensive houses in Sydney being located on it.
Property writer Cindy Martin calculated in 2002 that the total value of the properties on the one-kilometre waterfront section of Wolseley Road was worth, in total, $720 million.
In 2007, the Andrew Banks property on Wolseley Road was made an offer of $50 million, which was declined. In 2022, 20 Wolseley Road sold for $45 million.

In 2015, it was named the sixth most expensive street in the world. Notable residents include Frank Lowy and Malcolm Turnbull.

Housing styles
Houses in the area are designed according to the limited availability and price of land, as well as the physical nature of the location. There is considerable variety because every house is unique; in contrast to many Sydney suburbs, there has been no mass development with identical houses. The range of styles goes from Federation Arts and Crafts cottages to multi-storey mansions and some towers of home units.

Heritage Listed

The following items are Heritage Listed by Woollahra Council:

16-18 Wolseley Road	
20 Wolseley Road
28 Wolseley Road
63-67 Wolseley Road
66 Wolseley Road
69 Wolseley Road
134-136 Wolseley Road
138-140 Wolseley Road
142 Wolseley Road
Lady Martins Beach
Norfolk Island Pine
Seven Shillings Beach

References

External links

Streets in Sydney
Point Piper, New South Wales